Bures Hamlet is a civil parish in the Braintree district of Essex, England. At the 2011 census, it had a population of 749.

The parish covers the western part of the village of Bures, the eastern part being in the Bures St. Mary parish in Suffolk. It also includes Daw's Cross.

Bures railway station is in the parish.

The civil parish of Bures Hamlet rises from the west bank of the River Stour, in the county of Essex – the ancient Kingdom of the East Saxons, although it remains in the ecclesiastical parish of Bures St. Mary, Suffolk – land of the South Folk of the East Angles. This anomaly was first recorded in the footnotes to the Domesday Book of 1086 which correct the allocation of Bures lands between the counties.
The most populated part of the parish is the Hamlet itself, which flanks the river between the 20m and 25m (65’ and 81’) contour lines. Named when no more than a few scattered cottages, the Hamlet now rivals its parent Parish in size, with a population of some 765 people.
The rest of the parish of Bures Hamlet is undulating agricultural land with scattered patches of woodland, some being remnants of the ancient forest and later deer parks. Much of the parish lies between the valleys of the River Stour and Cambridge Brook. There are no other major settlements, but a few clusters of cottages by ancient greens and crossroads, and some isolated farms. The highest point in the parish is on the southwest corner of the parish boundary at 73m (237’). There are wide views into the Stour Valley from many parts of the parish.
An extensive network of public rights-of-Way provides off-road access to many parts of the parish. In addition, minor lanes that are relatively traffic-free intersect much of the parish, and while care must be taken in case vehicles are using the often winding and high-banked lanes, these can combine well with paths and bridleways to provide round and linear routes.

References

External links
Bures Community Web Site

Civil parishes in Essex
Braintree District